List of Crepis species. This plant genus is in the family of Asteraceae.

This is a list of binomial names, with just accepted species and not including synonyms.

Source: Plants of the World Online and IPNI.

A

Crepis achyrophoroides 
Crepis aculeata 
Crepis acuminata 
Crepis aitchisonii 
Crepis albescens 
Crepis albida 
Crepis alfredii 
Crepis alpestris 
Crepis alpina 
Crepis amanica 
Crepis amplexifolia 
Crepis apula 
Crepis arcuata 
Crepis arenaria 
Crepis armena 
Crepis asadbarensis 
Crepis aspera 
Crepis aspromontana 
Crepis atheniensis 
Crepis athoa 
Crepis atribarba 
Crepis aurea 
Crepis auriculifolia

B

Crepis bakeri 
Crepis baldaccii 
Crepis balliana 
Crepis barbigera 
Crepis bellidifolia 
Crepis bermejana 
Crepis bertiscea 
Crepis biennis 
Crepis bithynica 
Crepis bodinieri 
Crepis bungei 
Crepis bupleurifolia 
Crepis burejensis 
Crepis bursifolia

C

Crepis calycina 
Crepis canariensis 
Crepis capillaris 
Crepis carbonaria 
Crepis caucasica 
Crepis chloroclada 
Crepis chondrilloides 
Crepis chrysantha 
Crepis ciliata 
Crepis claryi 
Crepis clausonis 
Crepis commutata 
Crepis connexa 
Crepis conyzifolia 
Crepis coreana 
Crepis coronopus 
Crepis crocea 
Crepis cytherea 
Crepis czerepanovii

D

Crepis dachhigamensis 
Crepis darvazica 
Crepis demavendi 
Crepis dianthoseris 
Crepis dioritica 
Crepis dioscoridis 
Crepis divaricata 
Crepis × druceana

E

Crepis elbrusensis 
Crepis elongata 
Crepis elymaitica 
Crepis erythia

F

Crepis faureliana 
Crepis foetida 
Crepis foliosa 
Crepis fraasii 
Crepis friesii 
Crepis frigida 
Crepis froelichiana

G
 

Crepis gaubae 
Crepis gemicii 
Crepis gmelinii 
Crepis gossweileri 
Crepis granatensis 
Crepis guioliana 
Crepis gymnopus

H

Crepis hakkarica 
Crepis heldreichiana 
Crepis hellenica 
Crepis heterotricha 
Crepis hieracioides 
Crepis hierosolymitana 
Crepis himalaica 
Crepis hokkaidoensis 
Crepis hookeriana 
Crepis hypochoeridea

I/J

Crepis incana 
Crepis insignis 
Crepis insularis 
Crepis intermedia 
Crepis jacquinii 
Crepis juvenalis

K

Crepis karakuschensis 
Crepis kashmirica 
Crepis khorassanica 
Crepis koelzii 
Crepis kotschyana 
Crepis kurdica

L

Crepis lacera 
Crepis lampsanoides 
Crepis leontodontoides 
Crepis libanotica 
Crepis libyca 
Crepis lignea 
Crepis litardieri 
Crepis lomonosovae 
Crepis lyrata

M

Crepis macedonica 
Crepis macropus 
Crepis magellensis 
Crepis marschallii 
Crepis merxmuelleri 
Crepis micrantha 
Crepis microtaraxaconoides 
Crepis miyabei 
Crepis modocensis 
Crepis mollis 
Crepis monrealensis 
Crepis monticola 
Crepis muhlisii 
Crepis multicaulis 
Crepis multiflora

N

Crepis napifera 
Crepis neglecta 
Crepis newii 
Crepis nicaeensis 
Crepis nigrescens 
Crepis nigricans 
Crepis noronhaea 
Crepis novoana

O
 
Crepis occidentalis 
Crepis oporinoides 
Crepis oreadis

P

Crepis palaestina 
Crepis paludosa 
Crepis paniculas 
Crepis pannonica 
Crepis pantocsekii 
Crepis papposissima 
Crepis patula 
Crepis phoenix 
Crepis pleurocarpa 
Crepis pontana 
Crepis porrifolia 
Crepis praemorsa 
Crepis pterothecoides 
Crepis pulchra 
Crepis pulmonariifolia 
Crepis purpurea 
Crepis pusilla 
Crepis pygmaea 
Crepis pyrenaica

Q

Crepis quercifolia

R

Crepis ramosissima 
Crepis reuteriana 
Crepis rhaetica 
Crepis rigescens 
Crepis robertioides 
Crepis rubra 
Crepis rueppellii 
Crepis runcinata

S

Crepis sahendii 
Crepis salzmannii 
Crepis sancta 
Crepis schachtii 
Crepis schultzii 
Crepis semnanensis 
Crepis senecioides 
Crepis setosa 
Crepis sibirica 
Crepis sibthorpiana 
Crepis smyrnaea 
Crepis sonchifolia 
Crepis sprengelii 
Crepis stojanovii 
Crepis straussii 
Crepis subscaposa 
Crepis suffreniana 
Crepis syriaca

T

Crepis tectorum 
Crepis tenerrima 
Crepis terglouensis 
Crepis thompsonii 
Crepis tianshanica 
Crepis tingitana 
Crepis triasii 
Crepis trichocephala 
Crepis tungusica 
Crepis turcica 
Crepis turcomanica 
Crepis tybakiensis

U

Crepis urundica

V

Crepis vesicaria 
Crepis viscidula

W

Crepis willdenowii 
Crepis willemetioides

X

Crepis xylorrhiza

Z

Crepis zacintha

References

External links

Crepis